A data converter may refer to 
a digital-to-analog converter;
an analog-to-digital converter;
any other device used in data conversion.